The title Duke of Dalmatia may refer to:

the governors of the Byzantine Dalmatia
Doge of Venice, used the title between 1000 and 1358
Duke of Merania, sometimes called Duke of Dalmatia
Duke of Slavonia, occasionally used the title in the 13th and 14th centuries
Jean-de-Dieu Soult, who was granted the title by Napoleon I in 1808

See also
List of rulers of Croatia